Montenegrin women's handball clubs are participating in the EHF competitions since the season 1984/85. 
At the earlier times, Montenegrin teams represented SFR Yugoslavia or FR Yugoslavia in European competitions, and from 2006 and Montenegrin independence, they qualify through Montenegrin First League of Women's Handball and Montenegrin Women's Handball Cup.

European trophies
Montenegrin side ŽRK Budućnost Podgorica was extremely successful in the European Cups and today is among the best and most-trophied European and global women's handball teams. They are most successful Montenegrin sports team in European Cups, too. ŽRK Budućnost won six European titles, and among them are:
EHF Women's Champions League:
Winners: 2012, 2015
Women's EHF Cup Winners' Cup:
Winners: 1985, 2006, 2010
Women's EHF Cup:
Winners: 1987

Scores by clubs
Except ŽRK Budućnost, until today, representatives of Montenegro in women's EHF competitions were ŽRK Biseri Pljevlja, ŽRK Danilovgrad, ŽRK Nikšić and ŽRK Petrol Bonus Podgorica.
Majority of matches are played by ŽRK Budućnost Podgorica.

As of the end of EHF competitions 2018–19 season.

Results by season
Below is a list of games of all Montenegrin women's clubs in EHF competitions.

Opponents by countries
Below is the list of performances of Montenegrin clubs against opponents in EHF competitions by their countries (handball federations).

As of the end of EHF competitions 2018–19 season.

See also 
 Montenegrin First League of Women's Handball
 Montenegrin Women's Handball Cup
 Women's EHF Champions League
 Sport in Montenegro

External links 
Handball Federation of Montenegro

References

First Women's League